The RNA Tie Club was an informal scientific club, meant partly to be humorous, of select scientists who were interested in how proteins were synthesised from genes, specifically the genetic code. It was created by George Gamow upon the suggestion by James Watson in 1954, at the time the relationship between nucleic acids and amino acids in genetic information was unknown. The club consisted of 20 full members, each representing an amino acid, and four honorary members, representing the four nucleotides. The functions of the club members were to think up possible solutions and share in writing the other members.

The first important document of the RNA Tie Club was Francis Crick's adaptor hypothesis in 1955. Experimental works on the hypothesis led to the discovery of transfer RNA, a molecule that carry the key to genetic code. Most of the theoretical groundworks and preliminary experiments on genetic code were done by the club members within a decade; however, the actual code was first discovered by Marshall Nirenberg, a non-member, who received Nobel Prize in Physiology or Medicine in 1968 for the discovery.

History

Background 
In 1953, English biophysicist Francis Crick and American biologist James Watson, working together at the Cavendish Laboratory of the University of Cambridge, described correctly of the structure of DNA, the principal genetic materials in organisms, and based on it developed the concept of genetic information between DNA and proteins. By 1954, it was becoming to be understood that genetic information pathway involved DNA, RNA and proteins. However, the structure and nature of RNA were still a mystery (specific RNA molecules were not known until 1960), especially on how RNAs are involved in protein synthesis. Watson called this problem "the mysteries of life" in his letter to Crick.

Soviet-American physicist George Gamow then at the George Washington University gave the first possible scheme for protein synthesis from DNA. In early 1954, he spent several days at Woods Hole on Cape Cod with Crick, Watson and Sydney Brenner, discussing about genetics. Based on the Watson-Crick model, he proposed the "direct DNA template hypothesis" that states that proteins are directly synthesised from the double-stranded grooves of DNA. The four bases of DNA were assumed to synthesise 20 different combinations as triplets, that is the different amino acids, with overlapping nucleotide sequences. He published the hypothesis in the 13 February 1954 issue of Nature, explaining:It seems to me that such translation procedure can be easily established by considering the 'key-and-lock' relation between various amino-acids, and the rhomb-shaped 'holes' formed by various nucleotides in the deoxyribonucleic acid chain... One can speculate that free amino-acids from the surrounding medium get caught into the 'holes' of deoxyribonucleic acid molecules, and thus unite into the corresponding peptide chains.

Foundation 
In May 1954, Watson visited Gamow, who was then on sabbatical at the University of California, Berkeley. On discussing Gamow's hypothesis, he suggested that they form a 20-member club to work out the genetic code. Gamow instantly came up with the RNA Tie Club to "solve the riddle of the RNA structure and to understand how it built proteins" and with the motto "do or die; or don't try." 

The club thus consisted of 20 members, eminent scientists, each of whom corresponded to an amino acid, and an additional four honorary members (S. Brenner, VAL. F. Lipmann, A. Szent-Gyorgyi, and another individual), one for each nucleotide.

Each member received a woolen necktie with an embroidered helix on them, hence the name "RNA Tie Club".

Members

The tie and tiepin
Members of the RNA Tie Club were to receive a black wool-knit tie with a green and yellow RNA helix emblazoned on it. The original design of the tie came from Orgel, with the final pattern being a re-imagining by Gamow. Gamow's tie pattern was delivered to a Los Angeles haberdasher on Colorado Avenue by Watson, with the shop tailor promising to make the ties for $4 each.
Along with each tie, members of the club were to receive a golden tiepin with the three letter abbreviation of their club amino acid designation. Not all members may have received their pin. Gamow, however, wore his pin on several occasions, often causing some confusion and questioning of why he was wearing the "wrong initials".

Successes
The RNA Tie Club never organised a formal meeting of all the members. Members visited other members to discuss the scientific developments, usually involving cigars and alcohol. This time allowed for bonding and close friendships among this scientific elite, and it turned out to be a breeding ground for creative ideas. In most instances members mailed letters and preprints of articles suggesting new concepts and ideas.

Number of nucleotides in a codon

Using mathematics, Gamow postulated that a nucleotide code consisting of three letters (triplets) would be enough to define all 20 amino acids. This concept is the basis of "codons", and set an upper and lower limit on the size of a codon. Gamow had simply estimated that the number of bases and their complimentary pairs in a DNA strand could give 20 cavities for amino acids, meaning that 20 different amino acid could be involved in protein synthesis. He named this DNA–protein interaction as the "diamond code." Although Gamow's premise that DNA directly synthesized proteins was proven wrong, the nature of the triplet code became the foundation of genetic code.

Codons
Sydney Brenner proposed the concept of a codon, the idea that three non-overlapping nucleotides could code for one amino acid. His proof involved statistics and experimental evidence from amino acid protein sequences.

Adaptor hypothesis
Francis Crick proposed the "adaptor hypothesis" (the name given by Brenner) suggesting that some molecule ferried the amino acids around, and put them in the correct order corresponding to the nucleic acid sequence. The hypothesis contradicted Gamow's direct DNA template hypothesis positing that DNA could not synthesise proteins directly, but instead requires other molecules, adaptors, to mediate the DNA sequences to amino acid sequences. He also suggested that there were such 20 separate adaptor molecules. This was later to be found true by Robert Holley and the adaptor molecules were named transfer RNAs (tRNAs).

The typed paper distributed to the members of the RNA Tie Club in January 1955 as "On Degenerate Templates and the Adaptor Hypothesis: A Note for the RNA Tie Club" is described as "one of the most important unpublished articles in the history of science", and "the most famous unpublished paper in the annals of molecular biology." Watson recalled, "The most famous of these [unpublished] notes, by Francis, in time would totally change the way we thought about protein synthesis.

Personal successes
Many members of the RNA Tie Club achieved professional success, with six of them becoming Nobel laureates, namely Richard Feynman, Melvin Calvin, James Watson, Max Delbruck, Francis Crick and Sydney Brenner. However, the ultimate goal of understanding and deciphering the code link between nucleic acids and amino acids was achieved by Marshall Nirenberg, who was not a member of the RNA Tie Club, and received the Nobel Prize in Physiology or Medicine in 1968 with Holley and Har Gobind Khorana.

References

Genetics-related lists
History of genetics
Lists of scientists by membership
Chemistry societies
Biology societies